Donell McGary (born 1977), known professionally as Dibiase, is an American alternative hip hop producer from Watts, Los Angeles, California. He is also a member of Project Blowed hip-hop shop.

Career
Dibiase released his debut album, Machines Hate Me, on Alpha Pup Records in 2010. Pitchfork Media gave it 5.8 out of 10, while Resident Advisor gave it 4 out of 5. Before doing music, he made a living as a graphic artist. Unlike most hip-hop producers who use the Akai MPC and SP-1200, he primarily utilizes the SP-303 and SP-404 installments, for they provide a gritty lo-fi sound.

Discography

Albums
 Machines Hate Me (2010)
 Sound Palace (2011)
 Looney Goons (2012)
 Schematiks (2013)
 Baker's Dozen: DIBIA$E (2016)
 Bonus Levels (2019)

EPs
 Up the Joystick (2007)
 Los Angeles 1/10 (2010) with P.U.D.G.E.
 Comfort Zone (2011)
 Swingology 101 (2011)
 2Dirt4TV (2012) with Quelle Chris
 Collectin' Dust (2012)
 Throwbacks (2012)
 Llamaville (2012)
 10K (2013)
 Progressions (2013)
 Up the Joystick 2 (Hidden Levels) (2014)
 Excuse the Tape Hiss (2014)

Singles
 "Hue-Man Nature of the Beast" b/w "My Lady" (2009) with Droop-Capone
 "May the Force" (2009)
 "Fly Me t' the Moon" (2011) with Versis

Productions
 Intuition & Verbs – "Really" from Buzz (2009)
 Remarkable Mayor – "Floating", "Contradictions" and "Boogie Bounce" from The Campaign (2009)
 Exile – "Population Control (Dibiase Remix)" from Radio Bonus (2010)
 Dark House Family – "Mein Atari (Dibiase Lofi Reflip)" from Family Trees (2010)
 Take – "Neon Beams (Dibiase Remix)" from Only Mountain: The Remixes (2011)
 T. Calmese – "Out My Mind" from A Will of Fortune (2011)
 Flash Bang Grenada – "Good Cop, Bad Cop" from 10 Haters (2011)
 Blu – "Slngbngrs" from York (2011)
 Joe Styles – "Love, Peace, Happiness, and Rhythm", "Give You All My Heart", "I See You" and "Tel-Lie-Vision" from Elevation Music (2012)
 2Mex & Maiselph – "All Comes Down" from Like Farther... Like Sun... (2013)
 Clear Soul Forces – "We Be Runnin' This" from Gold PP7s (2013)
 Open Mike Eagle – "Jon Lovitz (Fantasy Booking Yarn)" from Dark Comedy (2014)
 Jonwayne – "These Words Are Everything" from Rap Album Two (2017)

References

External links
 
 

Alternative hip hop musicians
American hip hop record producers
Living people
1977 births
People from Watts, Los Angeles
Musicians from Los Angeles